Gastrochilus acutifolius is a species of orchid found in Assam (India), eastern Himalayas, Nepal, Myanmar and Vietnam.

References

External links 

Orchids of Assam
Orchids of Myanmar
Orchids of Nepal
Orchids of Vietnam
Acutifolius